Stari grad is an urban neighborhood of the city of Novi Sad, Serbia. It is the main part of Novi Sad, and it is also known as City Centre. In the Serbian language, the name "Stari grad" means "Old Town".

Location

Borders

The eastern borders of Stari grad are Kej žrtava racije (Quay of the victims of raid) and Beogradski kej (Belgrade Quay), the southern border is Bulevar Cara Lazara (Tzar Lazar Boulevard), the western border is Bulevar oslobođenja (Liberation Boulevard), the north-western borders are Jevrejska ulica (Jewish Street), Šafarikova ulica (Šafarik Street), Ulica Jovana Subotića (Jovan Subotić Street), and Temerinska ulica (Temerin Street), and the northern borders are Ulica Miloša Bajića (Miloš Bajić Street), Trg Republike (Square of the Republic), Daničićeva ulica (Daničić Street), Ulica Zlatne grede (Zlatna Greda Street), Pašićeva ulica (Pašić Street), Ulica Matice srpske (Matica Srpska Street), Sterijina ulica (Sterija Street), and Ulica Hadži Svetića (Hadži Svetić Street).

The neighbouring settlements are: Podbara in the north, Salajka, Rotkvarija and Grbavica in the west, and Liman in the south. In the east of the settlement is the river Danube.

Parts of the neighborhood
Stari grad (City Centre) is divided into the Old Centre and the New Centre, and the border between these two parts of the settlement is Bulevar Mihajla Pupina (Mihajlo Pupin Boulevard). The Old Centre is located on the northern side of this Boulevard, while the New Centre is located on the southern side.

One of the oldests parks in town, the Danube Park, is located in Stari grad.

History

Ancient times
A part of a Bronze Age Necropolis (2000-95 B.C.E.) was found at the site of the Library of Matica srpska.

Medieval times
In the medieval period (13th-16th century), a settlement named Bakša (Baksa, Baksafalva, Bakšić) existed at this location.

Birth of Stari grad

The settlement from which Stari grad (and Novi Sad) developed was founded in 1694. This settlement was known as Racka varoš or Petrovaradinski Šanac and was part of the Danube military frontier. The original area of Petrovaradin Šanac was in the northwest part of today's Stari grad and the southwest part of today's Podbara. Until the middle of the 19th century, the settlement mainly expanded to the west, where new urban districts — Rotkvarija, Salajka and Grbavica — were formed, and only later expanded to the east and south, so that some parts of today's Stari grad are newer in origin than some neighboring urban districts.

Little and Great Limans

In The General Urban Plan of 1845, the eastern border of the city's area was made up of the streets of Alekse Šantića, Želežnička, Narodnog heroja and Zmaj Jovina. 

The major expansion of the city centre towards the south and east occurred only after World War I and World War II, when Stari grad was given its present appearance. 

The southeastern part of today's Stari grad in the past was called "Mali Liman" (Little Liman) and "Veliki Liman" (Great Liman), which most of which is part of modern day Liman neighborhoods. Up until the early 1930s, the Little Liman contained ponds, sandbars, water plants, willows and meadows.

Little Liman covered today's Danube Park and the area along the Danube towards the former railway embankment, under which were the underpasses that connected to the Great Liman. The area of Little Liman was framed by the Danube, the Danube Street, the Zmaj Jovina Street, the King Alexander Street and the railway embankment (today’s Tsar Lazar Boulevard). 

In Little Liman, fishing from boats was common, and along the Danube, towards the Fortress, there was a collection of buildings called the Brukšanac (Bruckschanc), a small fortification that provided protection for a pontoon bridge. A few hundred meters upstream was the first city beach, with a wooden building on the water. This beach was later torn down to make room for the city flood embankment. The new city beach called Štrand would open in 1911 and would is located in what is today the banks of the Liman neighborhood. The name Little Liman was completely lost when the terrain was fully built and thus the central city core connected to the Danube.

Population
According to the data from JKP Informatika Novi Sad for 2010, the population of Stari grad was 17,383 residence. The registered residence in there three local communities were: "Stari grad" with 4,153; "Sonja Marinković" with 6,162; "Prva vojvođanska brigada" with 7,523.

Since 2022, Star grad neighborhood in total has about 18,506 residents registered in its three local communities: "Stari grad" with 3,963; "Sonja Marinković" with 6,088; "Prva vojvođanska brigada" with 8,455.

Local Communities
Stari grad is part of Novi Sad municipality, and since 1989 it is administratively divided into three local communities:
"Stari grad", located in King Alexander I Street, encompasses most of the core city center in the northern part of the neighborhood;
"Sonja Marinković", located in Žrtava racije Quay 4, encompasses most of the south eastern part of the neighborhood towards the Danube and bordering Žarka Zrenjanina Street and Stražilovska Street.
"Prva vojvođanska brigada", located in Dimitrija Abramovića 8, encompasses most of the south western part of the neighborhood towards the Liberation Boulevard and bordering Žarka Zrenjanina Street and Stražilovska Street.

Between 1980 and 1989, Stari grad was one of the seven municipalities of Novi Sad City. The municipality included the city quarter of Stari grad, part of Rotkvarija, and part of Liman.

Buildings

Some of the important buildings located in Stari grad are: City Hall, Bishop's Palace, White Banovina, Spens Sports Center, Vojvodina football stadium.

Culture

Churches

A churches located in Stari grad: Name of Mary Catholic Church, Minster Orthodox Church, Nikolajevska Orthodox Church, Saint George's Orthodox Cathedral, Uspenska Orthodox Church, Novi Sad Synagogue, Greek-Catholic Church.

Society

Institutions
Important institutions located in Stari grad: Parliament of the Autonomous Province of Vojvodina, Government of the Autonomous Province of Vojvodina, Matica Srpska, Library of Matica Srpska, Gallery of Matica Srpska, Serbian National Theatre, The Theatre of Young, Museum of Vojvodina, Archive of Vojvodina, Novi Sad Open University, Offset of the Serbian Academy of Science and Art, Vojvodina Academy of Sciences and Arts, People's Library, Cultural Centre of Novi Sad, Novi Sad Television, Novi Sad Radio.

See also
 Neighborhoods of Novi Sad
 History of Novi Sad
 Podbara
 Rotkvarija
 Grbavica
 Liman
 Petrovaradin
 Petrovaradin Fortress

References

Citations

Sources

Đorđe Randelj, Novi Sad - slobodan grad, Novi Sad, 1997.
Jovan Mirosavljević, Novi Sad - atlas ulica, Novi Sad, 1998.
Dr. Jovan Romelić, Liman, Enciklopedija Novog Sada, Book 13, Novi Sad, 1999.
Jovan Mirosavljević, Brevijar ulica Novog Sada 1745-2001, Novi Sad, 2002.
Zoran Rapajić, Novi Sad bez tajni, Beograd, 2002.
Melhior Erdujhelji, Istorija Novog Sada, Veternik, 2002.
Milorad Grujić, Vodič kroz Novi Sad i okolinu, Novi Sad, 2004.
Dragomir Ljubinac, 30 godina Mesne zajednice "7 juli" u Novom Sadu 1974-2004, monograph, Novi Sad, 2004.
Dr. Slobodan Ćučić, Naselja Bačke - geografske karakteristike, Novi Sad, 2007.
Milan Paroški, Novi Sad - stara varoš 7.000 godina, Novi Sad, 2008.

External links
 Detailed map of Novi Sad and Stari grad
 Map of Novi Sad
 Mapa Novog Sada

Novi Sad neighborhoods
Populated places established in 1694